The Women's 1000 metres race of the 2016 World Single Distances Speed Skating Championships was held on 12 February 2016.

Results
The race was started at 17:09.

References

Women's 1000 metres
World